McNary ARNG Field Heliport  is a military heliport located two miles (3 km) southeast of the city of Salem in Marion County, Oregon, United States. It is located on the north east corner of Salem Municipal Airport (McNary Field). The heliport serves as the primary base of activity for the Oregon National Guard Army Aviation Support Facility.

External links

Heliports in Oregon
Military installations in Oregon
United States Army airfields
Transportation in Salem, Oregon
Military heliports in the United States
Airports in Marion County, Oregon
Installations of the United States Army National Guard